Food Tech is a television series on the History Channel, about the making of foods, from the farming to the processing of the food. It was hosted by Bobby Bognar. Each episode focused on the various parts of different types or styles of meals, such as Mexican food, breakfast and hotel buffets.

Episodes

References

External links
 http://www.bobbybognar.com/

History (American TV channel) original programming